Coleothorpa is a genus of case-bearing leaf beetles in the family Chrysomelidae. The group is largely composed of species that were originally placed in the genus Euryscopa; some authorities have suggested placing these species into the genus Coscinoptera but the most recent revisions prefer to retain it as a separate genus.

Selected species
 Coleothorpa aenescens (Crotch, 1873)
 Coleothorpa axillaris (J. L. LeConte, 1868)
 Coleothorpa dominicana (Fabricius, 1801)
 Coleothorpa mucorea (J. L. LeConte, 1858)
 Coleothorpa panochensis (Gilbert, 1981)
 Coleothorpa seminuda (Horn, 1892)
 Coleothorpa vittigera (J. L. LeConte, 1861)

References

Further reading

 Arnett, R. H. Jr., M. C. Thomas, P. E. Skelley and J. H. Frank. (eds.). (21 June 2002). American Beetles, Volume II: Polyphaga: Scarabaeoidea through Curculionoidea. CRC Press LLC, Boca Raton, Florida .
 
 
 

Clytrini
Chrysomelidae genera